Carlos Izaguirre (30 May 1895 – 8 July 1975) was an Argentine footballer. He played in three matches for the Argentina national football team in 1914. He was also part of Argentina's squad for the 1919 South American Championship.

References

External links
 

1895 births
1975 deaths
Argentine footballers
Argentina international footballers
Place of birth missing
Association football forwards